This is a list of NUTS regions in the European Union by GDP. The European Union uses a classification for subnational territory called Nomenclature of Territorial Units for Statistics (commonly abbreviated as NUTS). The NUTS 1 classification is applied to a group of regions, NUTS 2 for regions and NUTS 3 as subdivisions of regions. There are also two levels (NUTS 4 and 5) which relate to local administrative unit levels. Countries agree a NUTS classification with the European Commission. Geddes notes that NUTS level 2 is "particularly important", because they often exist as territorial-government divisions and are used for regional policies by countries. NUTS 1 typically has a population of 3-7 million; NUTS 2 0.8-3 million; and NUTS 3 150,000-800,000. As of 2015, there are 98 regions at NUTS 1 level, 276 regions at NUTS 2 level and 1,342 regions at NUTS 3 level (as a result, statistics at the NUTS level 3 are found as an external link to this article). The EU is based on the classification of NUTS 2 regions as: less developed regions, transition regions and more developed regions. 
The EU's Structural Funds and Cohesion Fund direct funding to NUTS level 2 regions based on their GDP (PPS) per capita in comparison to the EU average: less developed regions (less than 75%), transition regions (between 75% and 90% and more developed regions (over 90%). For the period 2014–20, EUR 351 billion will be invested in the EU's regions with most being directed to the less developed regions.

NUTS level 1 (data in 2017)

NUTS level 2

See also 
Economy of the European Union
List of metropolitan areas in the European Union by GDP
 List of European regions by GDP

References

External links 
GDP at NUTS level 3: Euro total; Euro per capita; PPS total; PPS per capita; PPS per capita anomaly

European Union